is located in the Hidaka Mountains, Hokkaidō, Japan. It is the site of the Sahoro Ski Resort.

There are two routes up the mountain:
 Karikachi Pass route
 Sahoro Ski Resort route

References
 Shyun Umezawa, Yasuhiko Sugawara, and Jun Nakagawa, Hokkaidō Natsuyama Gaido 4: Hidaka Sanmyaku no Yamayama (北海道夏山ガイド4日高山脈の山やま), Sapporo, Hokkaidō Shimbunshya, 1991. 
 Google Maps
 Geographical Survey Institute

Sahoro